Tamarack mine is a copper mine located in Osceola Township, Houghton County, north of Calumet, Michigan.  The first shaft was started in 1882 and five shafts were eventually mined.  In 1966 seven-year-old Ruth Ann Miller fell into shaft #4 and a rescue was impossible.

See also
 Copper mining in Michigan
 List of Copper Country mines

Notes

Copper mines in Michigan
Buildings and structures in Houghton County, Michigan